PLN or pln or variation, may refer to:

Places
 Pellston Regional Airport, Pellston, Michigan, USA; IATA airport code PLN
 Picton, Lennox and Nueva, islands near the southern tip of South America

Organisations 
 Liberal Nationalist Party, a former political party of Nicaragua
 National Liberal Party (Panama), a political party of Panama
 National Liberation Party (Costa Rica), a political party of Costa Rica
 Perusahaan Listrik Negara, Indonesian government-owned electricity company

Science and technology 
 Phospholamban, a protein
  Peripheral lymph node
 Pln, the abbreviation for the orchid genus Pleione
 .pln, a file extension used by SilkTest
 Probabilistic logic network
 Planetary nebula

Other uses 
 Polish złoty, currency by ISO 4217 currency code
 Palenquero, ISO 639 language code pln
 Personal learning network
 Port letter and number, identifying fishing vessels

See also

 P. L. N. Padfield (1932–2012), British author
 
 Plan (disambiguation)